Albert Theodore "Allie" Moulton (January 16, 1886 – July 10, 1968) was a Major League Baseball second baseman who played in  with the St. Louis Browns.

External links

1886 births
1968 deaths
People from Medway, Massachusetts
Major League Baseball catchers
Baseball players from Massachusetts
St. Louis Browns players
Meridian Ribboners players
Vicksburg Hill Climbers players
Fort Worth Panthers players
Lowell Tigers players
Memphis Chickasaws players
Lynn Shoemakers players
Lynn Fighters players
Lynn Pirates players
Fitchburg Burghers players
Lowell Grays players